
Year 596 (DXCVI) was a leap year starting on Sunday (link will display the full calendar) of the Julian calendar. The denomination 596 for this year has been used since the early medieval period, when the Anno Domini calendar era became the prevalent method in Europe for naming years.

Events 
 By place 

 Byzantine Empire 
 Emperor Maurice uses the city of Marcianopolis (modern Bulgaria) as a military base of operations on the lower Danube River, against the Slavs on the Balkans.

 Britain 
 Battle of Raith: An invading force of Angles lands on the Fife coast near Raith (Kirkcaldy) and defeats an alliance of Scots, Britons and Picts, under King Áedán mac Gabráin of Dál Riata (Scotland).

 Asia 
 Emperor Wéndi sends diplomatic letters to the royal court of Goguryeo (Korea). He demands the cancellation of the military alliance with the Eastern Turk Khanate, and the raiding of Sui border regions. 

 By topic 

 Religion 
 Gregorian Mission: Augustine of Canterbury lands with a group of missionaries on the Isle of Thanet (South East England). He is welcomed by King Æthelberht of Kent, who accepts baptism along with the rest of his court at the behest of his Christian Frankish wife, Bertha. Æthelbert assigns Augustine and his 40 monks a residence at Canterbury (Kent), where they found a Benedictine monastery that will make the town a centre of Christianity (or 597).

Births 
 Cui Dunli, general of the Tang Dynasty (d. 656)
 Daoxuan, Chinese Buddhist monk (d. 667)
 Gao Jifu, chancellor of the Tang Dynasty (d. 654)
 Kōtoku, emperor of Japan (d. 654)
 Liu Xiangdao, official of the Tang Dynasty (d. 666)

Deaths 
 Ebrulf, Frankish hermit and abbot (b. 517)
 Marius Aventicensis, bishop of Aventicum (b. 532)

References